Pseudolycaena marsyas, the Cambridge blue, giant hairstreak or Marsyas hairstreak, is a species of butterfly in the family Lycaenidae.

Description
The uppersides of the wings are usually metallic blue, with hues varying from cobalt blue to turquoise blue depending on location. The apex of the wings are black and lightly falcade in males and the hindwings are tailed in both sexes, with a small black spot. The undersides of the wings are pale blue greyish, with several black spots and thin markings.

Distribution

Subspecies
Many forms varying in the hue of the blue but these are allocated to a single subspecies - Pseudolycaena marsyas marsyas.

References
 , 2007: Taxonomic comments on Pseudolycaena Wallengren (Lepidoptera: Lycaenidae: Theclinae: Eumaeini). Bulletin of the Allyn Museum 149: 1-22.
 "Pseudolycaena Wallengren, 1858" at Markku Savela's Lepidoptera and Some Other Life Forms

External links
 Learn about butterflies
 Butterflies of America

Eumaeini
Butterflies described in 1758
Taxa named by Carl Linnaeus